Tsukubusuma Shrine (都久夫須麻神社, Tsukubusuma Jinja) is a Shinto shrine on Chikubu Island in Shiga Prefecture, Japan. Its  is a National Treasure of Japan. The shrine's main festival is held annually on June 15. It is also called Chikubushima Shrine (竹生島神社, Chikubushima Jinja).

See also
 List of National Treasures of Japan (shrines)

References
Joseph Cali with John Dougill, Shinto Shrines: A Guide to the Sacred Sites of Japan's Ancient Religion (University of Hawai'i Press, 2013).

Religious buildings and structures completed in 710
Shinto shrines in Shiga Prefecture
8th-century establishments in Japan
8th-century Shinto shrines